The Israel national cricket team is the team that represents Israel in international cricket. Despite being geographically part of the Middle East, they are members of the European Cricket Council.

They regularly take part in the European Championship, and are currently ranked as the 12th best non-test team in Europe by the International Cricket Council (ICC), having been an associate member of that organisation since 1974.

In April 2018, the ICC decided to grant full Twenty20 International (T20I) status to all its members. Therefore, all Twenty20 matches played between Israel and other ICC members after 1 January 2019 will be a full T20I.

History

Beginnings

As is most often the case, cricket was introduced to Israel by the British. Local enthusiasts managed to keep the game going once the British had left in 1948, but the game was struggling until the mid-1960s, when an influx of Jewish immigrants from cricket playing countries revived the game, mainly South Africa, United Kingdom, and the Indian Subcontinent.

The first national league was formed in 1966, which led to the formation of the Israel Cricket Association (ICA) in 1968. The league prospered despite conditions ill-suited to cricket. Games were played on dusty, grass-less football fields, on matting wickets. However, the enthusiasm of the players has overcome these drawbacks.

ICC membership

Israel became an associate member of the ICC in 1974, with only Pakistan opposing their membership. Israel competed in the first ICC Trophy in 1979, failing to get past the first round. They also failed to progress beyond the first round in the 1982 tournament and 1986 tournament

They reached the plate competition of the ICC Trophy in 1990 and 1994 and in 1996 competed in the first European Championship in Denmark, finishing eighth in the eight team tournament. The 1997 ICC Trophy in Malaysia gave them a brief, though unwanted, moment in the spotlight. Malaysia does not recognise the state of Israel, and they faced political demonstrations throughout the tournament from the Islamic Party of Malaysia. They were the first Israeli sports team to play in the country and finished in 22nd  and last place.

In 1998, they finished ninth in the European Championship ahead of only Gibraltar and the following year travelled to Gibraltar to take part in a quadrangular tournament also involving France and Italy, losing to France in the third place play-off.

21st century

Israel have been playing in Division Two of the European Championships since 2000, finishing fifth in 2000, fourth in 2002 and sixth in 2004. In the 2006 tournament, the Israeli team were again met with protests, due to the then ongoing crisis in the Middle East. Their first match, against Jersey was cancelled and their remaining two group games were met by protests. Their play-off games were then moved to RAF Lossiemouth to be played under armed guard. The second of these games, against Greece was forfeited by the Greeks, who had travel problems. Israel thus finished in seventh place.

In November 2007, Israel were defeated in a relegation match against Croatia, in the first international cricket game played in Israel. The loss meant that they were relegated from the 2nd European division, to the 3rd Division. In 2009 they got promoted to Second division with a win over Croatia.

Israel played their first T20I match in the 2022 T20 World Cup Europe Qualifier.

Tournament history

ICC Trophy
1979: First round
1982: First round
1986: First round
1990: Plate competition
1994: Plate competition
1997: 21st place
2001: First round
2005: Did not qualify

European Championship
1996: 8th place
1998: 9th place
2000: 5th place (Division Two)
2002: 4th place (Division Two)
2004: 6th place (Division Two)
2006: 7th place (Division Two)
2009: 1st place (Division Three)
2010: 5th place (Division Two)

Records and Statistics 

International Match Summary — Portugal
 
Last updated 3 July 2022

Twenty20 International 
T20I record versus other nations

Records complete to T20I #1604. Last updated 3 July 2022.

Other matches
For a list of selected international matches played by Israel, see Cricket Archive.

See also
 List of Israel Twenty20 International cricketers
 Sports in Israel

References

Cricket in Israel
National cricket teams
Cricket
Israel in international cricket